Asociacion Deportivo Municipal Juayúa, also known simply as A.D. Municipal, is a professional football club based in Juayúa, El Salvador.

History
A.D. Municipal last played in the Salvadoran Second Division in 2010, when they were relegated after finishing bottom of Group A. They then played their home games in Nahuizalco.

Notable coaches 

 Manuel Molina (1959)
 Julio Magaña (1975)
 Jorge Wilmer Patrick  (2002)
 Ricardo Antonio López  (2003)
 Ricardo "Coneja" Guardado
 Pedro Antonio Contreras
 Ángel Orellana (2007)
 Raúl Héctor Cocherari

References

External links
 A.D. Municipal Profile at El Grafico.com 
 A.D. Municipal celebra sus 50 años - Diario CoLatino 
 Dos caras de un mismo liderato - Diario de Hoy 
 AD Municipal, a un juego de descender - La Prensa Gráfica 

Football clubs in El Salvador
Association football clubs established in 1963
1963 establishments in El Salvador